Bagha Nacha or Tiger Dance is performed in Binka, Sonepur of Subarnapur district and Brahmapur and in some parts of Ganjam district in Odisha. It is performed in the month of chaitra.

In this, the male dancer paints himself like a tiger. Thus, it is called Bagha Nacha or Tiger Dance.

References

Folk dances of Odisha